West Papua may refer to:
Western New Guinea, the western half of the island of New Guinea administered by Indonesia
West Papua (province), an Indonesian province comprising the Bird's Head Peninsula, Bomberai Peninsula, and adjacent islands
Republic of West Papua, a purported state seeking the independence of Western New Guinea from Indonesia

See also
 West Papuan (disambiguation)